is a Japanese speed skater. She competed in three events at the 1992 Winter Olympics.

References

1967 births
Living people
Japanese female speed skaters
Olympic speed skaters of Japan
Speed skaters at the 1992 Winter Olympics
Sportspeople from Hokkaido
Speed skaters at the 1986 Asian Winter Games
20th-century Japanese women